The following places in Utah are known as Black Rock:

 Black Rock, Juab County, Utah, a station on the Pony Express, see Wendover Cut-off
 Black Rock, Millard County, Utah, a ghost town
 Black Rock (Tooele County, Utah), a landmark and cape on the northern tip of the Oquirrh Mountains on the south end of the Great Salt Lake